The Alpine Public School District is a community public school district serving students in kindergarten through eighth grade in the Borough of Alpine in Bergen County, New Jersey, United States.

As of the 2018–19 school year, the district, comprising one school, had an enrollment of 138 students and 22.4 classroom teachers (on an FTE basis), for a student–teacher ratio of 6.2:1. In the 2016–17 school year, Alpine had the 33rd smallest enrollment of any school district in the state, with 160 students.

The district is classified by the New Jersey Department of Education as being in District Factor Group "I", the second-highest of eight groupings. District Factor Groups organize districts statewide to allow comparison by common socioeconomic characteristics of the local districts. From lowest socioeconomic status to highest, the categories are A, B, CD, DE, FG, GH, I and J.

For ninth through twelfth grades, public school students attend Tenafly High School in Tenafly as part of a sending/receiving relationship with the Tenafly Public Schools under which the Alpine district paid tuition of $14,392 per student for the 2011-12 school year. As of the 2018–19 school year, the high school had an enrollment of 1,226 students and 103.9 classroom teachers (on an FTE basis), for a student–teacher ratio of 11.8:1.

The district participates in special education programs offered by Region III, one of nine such regional programs in Bergen County. Region III coordinates and develops special education programs for the 1,000 students with learning disabilities in the region, which also includes the Closter, Demarest, Harrington Park, Haworth, Northvale, Norwood and  Old Tappan districts, as well as the Northern Valley Regional High School District.

History
The original school was located on Church Street in what was the old Post Office building which also has been removed and replaced with a new building. 

The entire cost of the project was paid for by contributions from residents.

School
As of the 2018–19 school year, the Alpine School had an enrollment of 135 students in grades K-8.

The school colors are green and white and its mascot is the Ram. The old colors were Blue and Yellow.
the original mascot was the bulldog.

Administration 
Core members of the school's administration are:
Maureen McCann, Superintendent/Principal
Olga Yarmolina, Business Administrator / Board Secretary

Board of education
The district's board of education, with five members, sets policy and oversees the fiscal and educational operation of the district through its administration. As a Type II school district, the board's trustees are elected directly by voters to serve three-year terms of office on a staggered basis, with one or two seats up for election each year held (since 2012) as part of the November general election. The board appoints a superintendent to oversee the day-to-day operation of the district.

References

External links 
Alpine Elementary School

School Data for the Alpine Elementary School, National Center for Education Statistics
Tenafly High School

Alpine, New Jersey
New Jersey District Factor Group I
School districts in Bergen County, New Jersey